Jacqui Delaney is a former Australia netball international. Between 1997 and 2002 she made 21 senior appearances for Australia. Delaney was a member of the Australia teams that won the gold medals at the 1999 World Netball Championships and the 2002 Commonwealth Games. At club level, Delaney played for Contax in both the South Australia state league and the Mobil Superleague and for Adelaide Thunderbirds in the Commonwealth Bank Trophy league. She was a member of the Thunderbirds squad won two premierships and grand finals in 1998 and 1999.

Early life and family
Delaney is originally from South Australia and grew up in the Murray River towns of Berri and Murray Bridge. In her youth, she played basketball before switching to netball at 15.
She is married to Roger Delaney, the former Australian rules footballer. They have three children, Yasmine (b. 1998) and twins, Cooper and Jada (born c.2006). The Delaneys settled in Sydney and then the Sunshine Coast. They live and work in the Coolum Beach/Peregian Beach/Noosa district.

Playing career

Contax
Delaney played for Contax in both the South Australia state league and the Mobil Superleague. In 1996 she was a member of the Contax team that won the state league premiership.

Adelaide Thunderbirds
Between 1997 and 2003, Delaney made 95 senior appearances for Adelaide Thunderbirds in the Commonwealth Bank Trophy league. Together with Kathryn Harby-Williams,  Peta Squire and Alex Hodge, she was a member of the Thunderbirds squad won two premierships and grand finals in 1998 and 1999. In the 1999 grand final against Adelaide Ravens, she was named the Player of the Match after scoring 38 goals with an 85% accuracy rate. She was also named the Commonwealth Bank Trophy MVP in both 1999 and 2001. During her playing career, Delaney made headlines for being "unintentionally controversial". During 1997 she continued to play while pregnant. In 2003 she successfully challenged Netball Australia's residential requirement and continued to play for Thunderbirds even after she and her family relocated to Sydney for work reasons.

Australia
Between 1997 and 2002, Delaney made 21 senior appearances for Australia. She was a member of the Australia team that won the 1996 World Youth Netball Championships. She made her senior debut for Australia on 6 June 1997. She was subsequently a member of the Australia teams that won the gold medals at the 1999 World Netball Championships and the 2002 Commonwealth Games.

Coach
In 2004 Delaney was appointed head coach of the Fairfield City-Sydney University Lions team in the New South Wales State League. She later became the head netball coach at  Good Shepherd Lutheran College.

Honours
Australia
World Netball Championships
Winners: 1999 
Commonwealth Games
Winners: 2002
Adelaide Thunderbirds
Commonwealth Bank Trophy
Winners: 1998, 1999
Runners Up: 1997
Contax
South Australia State League
Winners: 1996

References

Living people
Year of birth missing (living people)
Australian netball players
Australia international netball players
Netball players from South Australia
Commonwealth Games gold medallists for Australia
Netball players at the 2002 Commonwealth Games
Commonwealth Games medallists in netball
Contax Netball Club players
Esso/Mobil Superleague players
Adelaide Thunderbirds players
Commonwealth Bank Trophy players
Australian netball coaches
South Australia state netball league players
1999 World Netball Championships players
Medallists at the 2002 Commonwealth Games